Fayella is an extinct genus of dubious temnospondyl from the Early Permian (Guadalupian) of Oklahoma.

Taxonomy
The holotype of Fayella chickashaensis, FMNH UR 1004, comprises a brain case with part of basicraium, basipterygoid processes, and part of otic complex. It was found in the Chickasha Formation of Oklahoma. Olson (1972) referred a complete specimen (UCLA VP 3066) to Fayella based on cranial similarities. However, Gee et al. (2018) declared Fayella a nomen dubium, assigning it to Temnospondyli indeterminate and coining Nooxobeia for UCLA VP 3066, which is definitely a dissorophid.

See also

 Prehistoric amphibian
 List of prehistoric amphibians

References

Dissorophids
Cisuralian temnospondyls of North America
Fossil taxa described in 1965
Prehistoric amphibian genera
Nomina dubia